"Rap Devil" is a diss track performed by American rapper Machine Gun Kelly. The song is aimed at American rapper Eminem. The song was produced by Ronny J and Nils. It was released on September 3, 2018, by Bad Boy Records and Interscope Records, as a single from the rapper's second extended play Binge. The song's title is a play on Eminem's "Rap God", and is his response to Eminem's song "Not Alike". It peaked at number 13 on the Billboard Hot 100 singles chart in the United States. It also peaked at number 1 on the US iTunes Chart.

Background and release
In 2012, Machine Gun Kelly tweeted about Eminem's daughter, Hailie Mathers: "Ok, so I just saw a picture of Eminem's daughter... and I have to say, she is hot as fuck, in the most respectful way possible cuz Em is king". At the time, Hailie was 16 years old and MGK was 22 years old. In an interview in 2015, MGK said about the tweet: "Pictures of [Hailie] had came out, and I'm like, what, 20 years old, 21 at the time? I said 'She's beautiful, but all respect due. Eminem is king. What's wrong with that? Is there a 15-year age gap where I'm a creep for that? I was 21, dawg. Certain people took it, and ran with it and hyped it up." In a 2018 interview, Machine Gun Kelly said he did not know how old Hailie was and had reacted after seeing a headline about her saying she was all grown up. Machine Gun Kelly claims that years ago, while he did not speak to Eminem directly, he did speak with Eminem's manager and agreed to delete the tweet.

Eminem then banned him from going to Shade 45, a radio station owned by Eminem. MGK also collaborated on a song with Tech N9ne and allegedly sent subliminal insults towards Eminem. On August 31, 2018, Eminem released a surprise album, Kamikaze, on which he insulted several artists in multiple diss tracks, including the song "Not Alike", where he insulted MGK specifically.

Response
In an interview, when asked if he thought the song was a good diss track by Machine Gun Kelly, Eminem stated "it's not bad for him". Eminem then released a response diss track, "Killshot", on September 14, 2018. The official audio track on YouTube has over 450 million views as of March 2023.  On "Killshot", Eminem refers to Machine Gun Kelly as a "mumble rapper".

Music video
A music video for the song was released on WorldStarHipHop's YouTube channel and website on September 3, 2018. As of April 16th, 2022, the video stands at 347 million views.

Personnel
Credits adapted from Tidal.
Machine Gun Kelly – composition, vocals, recording, engineering
Ronny J – composition, production
Nils – composition, production
Steve "Rock Star" Dickey – mixing
Tony Dawsey – mastering

Charts

Certifications

Release history

See also
List of notable diss tracks

References

2018 songs
2018 singles
Diss tracks
Machine Gun Kelly (musician) songs
Songs written by Machine Gun Kelly (musician)
Songs written by Ronny J
Bad Boy Records singles
Interscope Records singles
Eminem
Song recordings produced by Ronny J